The Pit (Breitenbrunn am Neusiedlersee, Austria) is a land art project by Peter Noever in Breitenbrunn which has existed since the early 1970s and in 2019 was placed under monument protection by the Austrian Federal Office BDA.

Architecture 
The starting point of the Land Art project "The Pit“ is the more than 200-year-old, sandstone-built wine cellar. The northern end of the basement vault was uncovered, the basement wall was moved inwards, so that a vaulted, wind-protected space opens to the north, with benches and tables made of sandstone—from the connected quarry. This is followed by "The Pit" (8 meters in diameter at the bottom and 20 meters in diameter at the top of the funnel). The slope of the grassy slope is more than 50 degrees. In the hermetic but towards the sky wide open grass cone, one can sit in the open on sandstone blocks.

Projects, site map  
 Wine cellar
 The Pit
 Quarry Passageway
 Wing-Stairs
 Quarry-Stair Construction
 Toilet with concrete plateau
 Concrete Fragment Rudolph M. Schindler 
 36 concrete cubes
 Cube XXXVII 
 Airstream trailer 
 Sitting Pits
 The Tower, project, 1990 
 House with Boat, walk-in sculpture, project 2017/2019 
 The Resurrection, project by Sergej Bugaev Afrika and Peter Noever, 2018

Exhibitions 
 "Obsessions In_Focus“, April–August 2019, SCI-Arc, Southern California Institute of Architecture, Los Angeles.
 "MOEBEL UND", 2018, Christine König Galerie, Vienna, Austria.

Literature 
Albert Kirchengast, Norbert Lehner: Archaische Moderne – Elf Bauten im Burgenland 1960–2010 Vienna 2010, 
James Wines, „De-Architecture“, Rizzoli International Publications, Inc., New York, 1987, .
Fritz Damerius, „Breitenbrunn“, Autorenverlag Gerbergruben, 7100 Neusiedl, 2003, .
James Wines, „Grüne Architektur“, edited by Philip Jodidio, Taschen Verlag, Köln, London, Paris, New York, .
„Topos“ 11, European Landscape Magazine, Verlag Callwey, Munich, June 1995, . .
„Parnass“, Kunstmagazin 03 / 2005, Parnass Verlag, Vienna
„Interni“, La Rivist dell’Arredamento, 462 / Luglio, 1996, Mondadori Pubblicitá, Milan
„Wohn! Design“, Internationales Magazin für Architektur und Design, July / August 2001, Trend Medien Verlag, Stuttgart
„Archetype“, Architecture Magazine, Startling Papers Publishing Partnership; San Francisco CA, Volime I, Summer 1979 Number II
Peter Noever, „Die Grube, The Pit“, exhibition catalog, published by Aedes. Galerie und Architekturforum, Berlin, 1991, 
Peter Noever, „Upstairs Down“, The Pit. The Tower. The Terrace Plateau, Exhibition Catalog, Published by Shirin Neshat and Kyong Park
StoreFront for Art and Architecture, New York, 1994,

References

External links 
 Noevers „Die Grube“ unter Denkmalschutz auf ORF

Land art
Eisenstadt-Umgebung District
Buildings and structures in Eisenstadt
Tourist attractions in Burgenland